Pedro Juan Labarthe López de Victoria (21 June 1905 – March 1966) was a Puerto Rican poet, journalist, essayist, and novelist.

Birth place, training and life
Pedro Juan Labarthe López de Victoria was born in Ponce, Puerto Rico in 1905. As an adult he moved from Puerto Rico to New York City to study at Columbia University. He earned professional success and embraced the American way of life, and subsequently wrote various books and essays documenting the experiences of the Puerto Rican migration to New York.

Books
The following are books written by Labarthe:
 The Son of Two Nations: The Private Life of a Columbia Student. (1931)
 . (1946)
 Mary Smith. (1958)
 Pueblo: Golgota del Espiritu. (1938)

See also

 List of Puerto Ricans

References

External links
Mention of Pedro J. Labarthe's lifespan

Poets from Ponce
Journalists from Ponce
1905 births
1966 deaths
Puerto Rican poets
Puerto Rican male writers
Puerto Rican journalists
Columbia University alumni
20th-century American poets
20th-century American male writers
20th-century Puerto Rican poets
20th-century journalists